Warlmanpa (also Walmala) is a nearly extinct Australian Aboriginal language.

The Warlmanpa have a highly developed sign language.

Phonology
Warlmanpa consonant inventory

Warlmanpa vowel inventory

External links 
 Paradisec has a collection that include Warlmanpa language materials.

References

Ngarrkic languages
Endangered indigenous Australian languages in the Northern Territory